Thanasi Kokkinakis was the defending champion but chose not to defend his title.

Holger Rune won the title after defeating Marco Trungelliti 6–3, 5–7, 7–6(7–5) in the final.

Seeds

Draw

Finals

Top half

Bottom half

References

Main draw
Qualifying draw

Biella Challenger VII - 1